Igor Prins (born 21 October 1966) is an Estonian football manager and former professional player.

International career
Prins made his international debut for the Estonia national team on 3 June 1992 in a historic 1–1 draw against Slovenia in a friendly. The match was Estonia's first official match since restoration of independence and Slovenia's first match ever. Prins made a total of 20 appearances for the team.

Honours

Player
Pärnu Kalakombinaat/MEK
 Estonian SSR Championship: 1985

Zvezda
 Estonian SSR Championship: 1986

Lantana
 Meistriliiga: 1995–96

Levadia
 Meistriliiga: 1999, 2000
 Estonian Cup: 1998–99, 1999–2000

Manager
Levadia
 Meistriliiga: 2008, 2009

Nõmme Kalju
 Meistriliiga: 2012

References

External links

1966 births
Living people
Sportspeople from Pärnu
Soviet footballers
Estonian footballers
Estonia international footballers
FCI Levadia Tallinn players
Nõmme Kalju FC players
FC Flora players
Estonian football managers
FCI Levadia Tallinn managers
Nõmme Kalju FC managers
Meistriliiga players
Esiliiga players
Association football midfielders
Pärnu JK Vaprus managers